The second album by Brazilian pop singer Marjorie Estiano, Flores, Amores e Blábláblá marks a departure for the singer. It's a blend of pop, soul, R&B, house, EDM, and trance. For Flores, Amores e Blábláblá she brings a cover of the Beatles song "Oh! Darling", a melancholic "Doce Novembro" (Sweet November) and an agitated "Tatuagem" (Tattoo), composed by Rita Lee.

Track listing
Tatuagem (Tattoo)
Ponto de Partida (Starting Point)
Espirais (Spirals)
Meu Tempo (My Time)
Jeito Zen (Zen Way)
Oh! Darling 
Branquela (Whitey)
Flores (Flowers)
Essencial (Essential)
Outras Intenções (Other Intentions)
Alucinados (Hallucinated)
Doce Novembro (Sweet November)
Desencanto (Disenchantment)
Boogie Woogie

Singles 

2007 albums
Marjorie Estiano albums